Gomel Airport  is an airport located 3 km north-east from Gomel, the second-largest city in Belarus. It was opened in 1968.

History

Since the mid-1950s, regular flights to Minsk and Kiev from the old Gomel airport to remote regional centers of the region, and sanitary and agricultural aviation were also based here. In 1968, the current airport was built with a concrete runway, to which An-24 was the first to land.

Gomel airport was a hub of Gomelavia airline, which ceased operations on 22 February 2011 due to bankruptcy.

From 25 July 2011 Belarusian flag carrier, Belavia, started serving flights from Gomel to Kaliningrad during summer seasons once again.

Besides Belarusian air companies, Latvian flag carrier AirBaltic had served flights between Gomel and Riga in 2006, but this destination has been defunct ever since.

Gomel airport is now mainly used for charter flights to Italy, Belgium, Spain and some other Western European countries.

In summer 2014, because of local population's awareness about instability and ongoing war in Ukraine, Belavia started to carry out new charter flights from Gomel to Thessaloniki and Burgas. Flights to Kaliningrad since summer 2014 have a stopover at Minsk National Airport.

During the 2022 Russian invasion of Ukraine, the Gomel Airport was used by the Russian military for military purposes, including launching air strikes against Ukraine, as evidenced by a video released by the Russian Ministry of Defence.

Airlines and destinations

Ground transport

Suburban bus route from airport to Gomel central bus station goes once a day in both directions

References

External links

1968 establishments in Belarus
Airports built in the Soviet Union
Airports in Belarus
Gomel
Buildings and structures in Gomel Region
Airports established in 1968